Gabriel do Carmo (born 12 April 1990 in Guarulhos) is a Brazilian professional footballer who plays as a forward for Ranong United in Thai League 2.

Career
In June 2017, do Carmo signed with Bulgarian Second League side Sozopol.  He left the club at the end of the 2017–18 season. On 4 April 2019, de Carmo joined Ulaanbaatar City in Mongolia.

Honours

Club
Ulaanbaatar City
Mongolian Premier League: 2019

References

External links

1990 births
Living people
People from Guarulhos
Brazilian footballers
Brazilian expatriate footballers
Coritiba Foot Ball Club players
Vila Nova Futebol Clube players
Asteras Tripolis F.C. players
PFC Lokomotiv Plovdiv players
Panachaiki F.C. players
FK Partizani Tirana players
Associação Atlética Flamengo players
Bangu Atlético Clube players
FC Sozopol players
Akritas Chlorakas players
Ulaanbaatar City FC players
Persela Lamongan players
Persiraja Banda Aceh players
Campeonato Brasileiro Série A players
Campeonato Brasileiro Série C players
Super League Greece players
First Professional Football League (Bulgaria) players
Super League Greece 2 players
Kategoria Superiore players
Second Professional Football League (Bulgaria) players
Cypriot Second Division players
Mongolian National Premier League players
Liga 1 (Indonesia) players
Gabriel do Carmo
Brazilian expatriate sportspeople in Greece
Expatriate footballers in Greece
Brazilian expatriate sportspeople in Bulgaria
Expatriate footballers in Bulgaria
Brazilian expatriate sportspeople in Albania
Expatriate footballers in Albania
Brazilian expatriate sportspeople in Cyprus
Expatriate footballers in Cyprus
Expatriate footballers in Mongolia
Brazilian expatriate sportspeople in Indonesia
Expatriate footballers in Indonesia
Brazilian expatriate sportspeople in Thailand
Expatriate footballers in Thailand
Association football forwards
Footballers from São Paulo (state)